Vishnu Bhikaji Gokhale (1825–1871), popularly known as Vishnubawa Brahmachari and as Brahmachari Bawa, was a 19th-century Marathi Hindu revivalist. An ascetic defender of the Hindu dharma, he was known for his religious polemics, chiefly against Christianity. He was known for his "witty repartee and vigorous argument" confronting Christian missionaries and, occasionally, other Hindus. His 1857 debates in Bombay were widely publicized in English and Marathi in at least nine books. He has been described variously as "the first great revivalist of modern Maharashtra," "predecessor of the two great swamis of modern times, Dayananda and Vivekananda," and "a queer bird."

Biography
Brahmachari was born Vishnu Bhikaji Gokhale in 1825 in the village of Shiravali (near Mahad in the then Thana district) as the tenth child of a Konkanastha (Chitpavan) Brahman family. Educated in a village school for a few years, he also studied the Vedas. He arrived in Bombay in 1856. He was the author of "The Marathi avatar of The Communist Manifesto." He died on a Mahashivarathri day in the Viththal Mandir in Bombay on 18 February 1871.

See also
 Hindu revivalism
 Dayananda Saraswati
 Swami Vivekananda

Citations

References

1825 births
1871 deaths
19th-century Hindu religious leaders
Hindu missionaries
Hindu revivalists
Hindu apologists